Martien Vreijsen (born 15 November 1955 in Breda) is a Dutch former footballer who played as a striker.

He has earned one cap for the Netherlands national football team in 1980, and participated in the Euro 1980.

References

External links

1955 births
Living people
Footballers from Breda
Dutch footballers
Association football forwards
NAC Breda players
Feyenoord players
FC Twente players
Eredivisie players
Eerste Divisie players
Netherlands international footballers
UEFA Euro 1980 players